The 2005 New York City mayoral election occurred on Tuesday, November 8, 2005, with incumbent Republican mayor Michael Bloomberg soundly defeating former Bronx borough president Fernando Ferrer, the Democratic nominee. Several third-party candidates also ran for mayor. Bloomberg won four of the five boroughs, the exception being the Bronx.

, the 2005 election is the last time a Republican was elected mayor of New York City and the last time a Republican line carried Brooklyn. (Bloomberg left the Republican Party in 2007 to register as an independent, though he was nominated for re-election by the Republican Party in 2009.)

Background
In July, mayoral candidates filed nominating petitions with the City Board of Elections.

Republican primary

Candidates
 Michael Bloomberg, incumbent Mayor since 2002
 Walter Iwachiw
 Tom Ognibene, former City Councilman from Queens (1992-2002) and Council minority leader
 Steve Shaw

Campaign
Tom Ognibene ran on a platform supporting tax cuts, education reform and opposed Mayor Bloomberg's smoking ban. He was expected to win the endorsement of the Conservative Party. He received 8,100 signatures, 600 more than the necessary 7,500 signatures to appear on the primary ballot. However, the Bloomberg campaign challenged many signatures, leaving Ognibene with 5,848 eligible signatures and forcing him off the ballot. On August 25, a federal judge refused to allow Ognibene on Republican ballot.

The first television ads were launched in English and Spanish by the Bloomberg campaign on May 18.

Endorsements
Ognibene was endorsed by the leaders of the Queens County Republican Committee on February 10.

Aftermath
Ognibene challenged the Republican nomination in a hearing on Thursday, August 25, but his challenge was unsuccessful.

Democratic primary

Candidates
 Christopher X. Brodeur, artist and Green Party candidate in 2001
 Fernando Ferrer, former Bronx Borough President (1987–2001) and candidate for Mayor in 2001
 C. Virginia Fields, Manhattan Borough President
 Gifford Miller, Speaker of the New York City Council
 Arthur Piccolo
 Anthony Weiner, U.S. Representative from Brooklyn and Queens

Declined
Mark J. Green, nominee for mayor in 2001 (running for New York Attorney General in 2006)
Bob Kerrey, former U.S. Senator from Nebraska and President of the New School (declined April 20)

Campaign
On August 3, Fernando Ferrer began running campaign advertisements. On August 12, the Gifford Miller campaign launched their own television ads. The Democratic candidates held their first debate on August 16. The Anthony Weiner campaign launched television ads on August 19, the same day voter registration for the primary elections ended. The Democratic candidates held their second televised debate on August 21; the live debate was sponsored by WCBS and the New York Times.

Endorsements
On September 1, Fernando Ferrer was endorsed by City Comptroller William C. Thompson and ACORN. On September 3, the New York Times endorsed Ferrer in the Democratic primary. The Democratic candidates held two final debates with the first on WNBC on September 7 and on WABC on September 8. On September 10, Reverend Al Sharpton endorsed Ferrer.

Prior to the primary, Ferrer was endorsed by New York state attorney general Eliot Spitzer, Carl McCall, Geraldine Ferraro, Sheldon Silver, the Transport Workers Union, Bronx borough president Adolfo Carrión, Jr. and Ruth Messinger. Ferrer was also endorsed by Representatives Joseph Crowley, Gregory W. Meeks, Major Owens, José Serrano, Ed Towns and Nydia Velázquez.

Results

The Democratic primary was held on Tuesday, September 13 with initial returns showing Fernando Ferrer receiving 39.95% of the votes, just short of the 40% needed to avoid a run-off with second-place Anthony Weiner. Despite at first seeming poised to continue, the next morning Anthony Weiner conceded the election to Fernando Ferrer. However, the city election board insisted on proceeding with a $12 million election scheduled for Tuesday September 27, with an additional debate even planned.  This prompted a lawsuit supported by both candidates to prevent the election, the circumstance of which was avoided by a final count giving Ferrer just slightly over 40% of the vote.

Other nominations

Conservative
Despite his removal from the Republican primary, Tom Ognibene ran as the Conservative Party nominee.

Independence
On May 28, the Independence Party endorsed Michael Bloomberg for re-election.

Liberal
The Liberal Party of New York endorsed Bloomberg.

Green
Anthony Gronowicz, Manhattan College history professor Anthony Gronowicz was the Green Party's mayoral nominee. Gronowicz sought to strengthen affordable housing, supported renewable sources of energy and sought to provide free tuition to City University of New York. He was featured in an article in The Villager.

Libertarian
Audrey Silk, a former NYPD officer, community activist and founder of NYC Citizens Lobbying Against Smoker Harassment, was nominated by the party on April 16, 2005.

General election

Candidates
 Michael Bloomberg, incumbent mayor since 2002 (Republican, Independence, Liberal)
 Fernando Ferrer, former Bronx Borough President (Democrat)
 Tom Ognibene (Conservative)
 Anthony Gronowicz (Green)
 Jimmy McMillan (Rent Is Too Damn High)
 Audrey Silk (Libertarian)
 Martin Koppel (Socialist Workers)
 Seth Blum (Education)

Campaign
Issues in the 2005 mayoral race included education, taxes, crime, transportation, public housing, homeland security funding and the city budget. One prominent issue throughout 2005 was New York's bid for the 2012 Olympic Games as New York City was one of the finalists to serve as host city. On June 6, the planned West Side Stadium was defeated by the Public Authorities Control Board when Assembly Speaker Sheldon Silver and State Senate Majority Leader Joseph Bruno refused to vote for it. As a result, the new Mets ballpark, later Citi Field, had been supported by Mayor Bloomberg as the centerpiece of the revised bid. On July 6, the IOC awarded London with the 2012 Summer Olympics.

On October 23, Ferrer proposed Home Owner Property Exemption, or HOPE, a tax break for homeowners with a home property value of less than $100,000.

On October 6, a mayoral debate was held at the Apollo Theater from 7:00 p.m. to 8:30 p.m. with Fernando Ferrer and Tom Ognibene; Mayor Michael Bloomberg was absent. The last day for voter registration for the general election was October 14, 2005. The first mayoral debate between Fernando Ferrer and Mike Bloomberg was held on October 30 and broadcast on WABC. Ferrer and Bloomberg debated each other again on November 1 at a debate sponsored by WNBC and the New York City Campaign Finance Board.

The general election was held on Tuesday, November 8. Members of the New York City Council as well as the offices of borough president, city comptroller, public advocate and district attorney were also up for election. At 10:30 p.m. on November 8, Fernando Ferrer conceded the election to Michael Bloomberg in a speech at the Waldorf-Astoria hotel. Bloomberg was sworn in for a second term on January 1, 2006.

Endorsements
Bloomberg was endorsed by former mayors Rudy Giuliani and Ed Koch, Jeanine Pirro, Herman Badillo, former congressman Reverend Floyd Flake, Reverend Calvin Butts, and many prominent local Democrats who chose to cross party lines.

On October 23, Bloomberg was endorsed by both Newsday and The New York Times for the general election. The Times wrote Bloomberg could be "one of the greatest mayors in New York history"; however, the Times editorial board criticized "his 'obscene' unlimited spending on his political campaigns" creating an "uneven playing field".

After winning the Democratic nomination, Ferrer was endorsed by Senators Charles Schumer and Hillary Clinton on September 16. On September 19, Ferrer received the endorsement of SEIU Local 1199. He was endorsed by former mayor David Dinkins on September 23. Ferrer was endorsed by the Working Families Party on September 27, but did not appear on the Working Families Party line on Election Day. Andrew Cuomo endorsed Ferrer on September 29. On October 20, Ferrer campaigned with Bill Clinton on Charlotte Street in the South Bronx.

Polling

Results

Results by borough

Notes

References

External links
 Mike Bloomberg for NYC webpage
 CityMayors.com NYC elections page
 Gotham Gazette 2005 webpage

See also 

Mayoral election, 2005
2005
New York City mayoral
New York
Michael Bloomberg